Carl Nordling (6 February 1931 – 1 April 2016) was a Swedish physicist who was a professor of physics at Uppsala University. He was a member of the Royal Swedish Academy of Sciences and served as the chairman of the Nobel Committee for Physics.

Publications
 Physics handbook: Elementary constants and units, tables, formulae and diagrams, and mathematical formulae
 4th edition 1987: Chartwell-Bratt: ,  Studentlitteratur AB 
 Studentlitteratur, 2004: 
 How to get the Nobel Prize in physics - Physica Scripta 1995 T59 21-25

External links
 Official Website

1931 births
2016 deaths
Swedish physicists
Academic staff of Uppsala University
Members of the Royal Swedish Academy of Sciences
Members of the Royal Society of Sciences in Uppsala